Stonegate Pub Company is the largest pub company in the UK, operating around 4,800 managed, leased and tenanted pubs . It is owned by TDR Capital. The head office is based in Solihull, UK, and the company is registered in the Cayman Islands.

History

The company was formed in 2010 by the private equity firm TDR Capital, after it purchased 333 pubs from Mitchells & Butlers. Originally trading from rented offices near Birmingham airport, it then moved its operations office to Capability Green in Luton in June 2011 when Stonegate bought the Town & City Pub Company which was in receivership, creating the largest privately held managed pub operator in the UK and acquiring the Yates's and Slug and Lettuce brands in the process.

In August 2013, Stonegate acquired 13 Living Room sites from Premium Bars & Restaurants. In June 2015, a further 15 sites were acquired from the Scottish pub, bar and hotel operator, Maclay Inns, and later that same year Stonegate acquired 53 pubs from Tattershall Castle Group (TCG) including the Henry's Café Bar and Tattershall Castle brands.

In January 2016, the company began updating former TCG estate pubs and rebranding many of the venues to Slug & Lettuce. Later that year, Stonegate exchanged on a package of ten JD Wetherspoon pubs and acquired the Walkabout owner Intertain, adding a further 30 sites to its portfolio.

In 2017, the company acquired the Sports Bar & Grill concept and, in 2018, Be At One and 15 Novus Leisure sites.

In January 2019, Stonegate acquired Bar Fever Ltd (Fever Bars) – 32 venues: 29 bars, including Fever Boutique, Zinc and Moo Moo, as well as three Bierkellar Bavarian pubs and a further six sites from Novus Leisure.

Following the acquisition of Ei Group on 3 March 2020 for £1.27bn, Stonegate Pub Company became the largest pub company in the UK, with around 5,000 sites. It has 1,270 sites within the managed division and 3,457 leased and tenanted businesses.

During the COVID-19 pandemic, Stonegate furloughed 16,500 workers under a UK job retention programme. This drew negative attention due to the company's Cayman Islands registration. A Stonegate spokesperson said, "Last year Stonegate paid over £300m in tax in the UK. As a UK business, fully paying UK tax, we have every right to access government assistance."

Brands 
Stonegate's managed pubs division is split into branded and traditional (unbranded) pubs. Branded pubs are Slug & Lettuce, Walkabout, Be At One, and venues (including Popworld and Fever).

See also
 List of public house topics

References

External links
 

 
British companies established in 2010
Pub chains
Pubs in the United Kingdom